Howard Jones (born July 20, 1970) is an American metalcore vocalist best known as the former lead singer of Killswitch Engage and Blood Has Been Shed. He is the current vocalist of Light the Torch, formerly known as Devil You Know, and SION with YouTuber/guitarist Jared Dines.

Career
Jones started making music in the underground band Driven in 1996, releasing a single album. He later performed with Blood Has Been Shed from 1997 to 2004. In 2002, he joined Killswitch Engage as their new vocalist after Jesse Leach left the band. During his time with Killswitch Engage, they released two gold-certified albums, The End of Heartache and As Daylight Dies.

Jones started a new band Devil You Know with guitarist Francesco Artusato (All Shall Perish) and drummer John Sankey (Devolved, Fear Factory and Divine Heresy). After Sankey's departure and his attempt to claim the copyright of the band's name, the rest of the band members started again with a fresh name, Light the Torch, with the addition of a new drummer.

In March 2021, Jones joined with heavy metal YouTuber Jared Dines and producer Hiram Hernandez to release "The Blade" as part of a new project named Sion.

Personal life
Jones is an avid fisherman and owns property on the Red River of the North in Manitoba, Canada. He is a frequent guest on Jamey Jasta's podcast on the GaS Digital Network. Jones left Killswitch Engage in early 2012 to allow himself to manage his type 2 diabetes which was worsened by a hectic touring lifestyle. In 2013, Jones stated that his diabetes put him in a coma for three days.

In 2015, Jones revealed that he had struggled with anxiety and depression for a long time, which had been worsened by his rise to fame in Killswitch Engage. He revealed that he had come close to committing suicide in 2009, when he had aimed a .44 Magnum revolver at his head in his apartment in Connecticut, and that the police had intervened after being notified by a concerned neighbor. In 2018, he teamed up with his former band to raise awareness for mental health; the resulting song "The Signal Fire" appears on the 2019 album Atonement.

Jones used to be straight edge. Today, he shares a passion for medical cannabis with friend and fellow Killswitch Engage frontman Jesse Leach.

Discography

Blood Has Been Shed
I Dwell on Thoughts of You (September 21, 1999, Ferret Records)
Novella of Uriel (February 20, 2001, Ferret Records)
Spirals (March 11, 2003, Ferret Records)

Killswitch Engage
The End of Heartache (May 11, 2004, Roadrunner Records)
As Daylight Dies (November 21, 2006, Roadrunner Records)
Killswitch Engage (June 30, 2009, Roadrunner Records)

Light the Torch (formerly Devil You Know)
 The Beauty of Destruction (April 25, 2014, Nuclear Blast)
 They Bleed Red (November 6, 2015, Nuclear Blast)
 Revival (March 30, 2018, Nuclear Blast)
 You Will Be the Death of Me (June 25, 2021, Nuclear Blast)

SION
 SION (November 26, 2021, Independent)

Guest appearances
Fragment – Answers ("Inertia") *First ever guest appearance 
36 Crazyfists – Rest Inside the Flames ("Elysium")
Demon Hunter – Summer of Darkness ("Our Faces Fall Apart")
Eighteen Visions – Vanity ("One Hell of a Prize Fighter")
Roadrunner United – All-Star Sessions ("The Dagger")
Throwdown – Vendetta ("The World Behind")
Ill Bill – The Hour of Reprisal ("Babylon")
Every Time I Die – Last Night in Town ("Punch-Drunk Punk Rock Romance")
Believer – Gabriel ("The Brave")
Asking Alexandria – From Death to Destiny ("Until the End") *First guest appearance since leaving Killswitch Engage.
Within Temptation – Hydra ("Dangerous")
Jasta - The Lost Chapters ("Chasing Demons") Hatebreed's Jamey Jasta To Release New Jasta Set "The Lost Chapters"
Violent New Breed - Bad Reputation ("Bury Me")
Killswitch Engage - Atonement ("The Signal Fire")
Jasta - The Lost Chapters Volume 2 ("Heaven Gets What It Wants")
Crobot - Rat Child ("Kiss it Goodbye")
Eyes Set to Kill - Damna ("Face the Rain")

References

1970 births
20th-century American singers
21st-century American singers
20th-century African-American male singers
African-American rock singers
American baritones
American heavy metal singers
Singers with a three-octave vocal range
Living people
Musicians from Columbus, Ohio
Musicians from Ohio
People from Columbus, Ohio
Killswitch Engage members
Blood Has Been Shed members
20th-century American male singers
21st-century American male singers
21st-century African-American male singers